

Critical point

References

CRC.a-d
David R. Lide (ed), CRC Handbook of Chemistry and Physics, 85th Edition, online version. CRC Press. Boca Raton, Florida, 2003; Section 6, Fluid Properties; Critical Constants. Also agrees with Celsius values from Section 4: Properties of the Elements and Inorganic Compounds, Melting, Boiling, Triple, and Critical Point Temperatures of the Elements
Estimated accuracy for Tc and Pc is indicated by the number of digits. Above 750 K Tc values may be in error by 10 K or more. Vc values are not assumed accurate more than to a few percent. Parentheses indicate extrapolated values. From these sources:
(a) D. Ambrose, Vapor-Liquid Constants of Fluids, in R.M. Stevenson, S. Malanowski, Handbook of the Thermodynamics of Organic Compounds, Elsevier, New York, (1987).
(b) I.G. Dillon, P.A. Nelson, B.S. Swanson, J. Chem. Phys. 44, 4229, (1966).
(c) O. Sifner, J. Klomfar, J. Phys. Chem. Ref. Data 23, 63, (1994).
(d) N.B. Vargaftik, Int. J. Thermophys. 11, 467, (1990).

LNG
J.A. Dean (ed), Lange's Handbook of Chemistry (15th Edition), McGraw-Hill, 1999; Section 6; Table 6.5 Critical Properties

KAL
National Physical Laboratory, Kaye and Laby Tables of Physical and Chemical Constants; D. Ambrose, M.B. Ewing, M.L. McGlashan, Critical constants and second virial coefficients of gases (retrieved Dec 2005)

SMI
W.E. Forsythe (ed.), Smithsonian Physical Tables 9th ed., online version (1954; Knovel 2003). Table 259, Critical Temperatures, Pressures, and Densities of Gases

See also 

Phase transitions
Units of pressure
Temperature
Properties of chemical elements
Chemical element data pages